Yinchuan–Xi'an high-speed railway, is a dual-track, electrified, high-speed rail line in Northwest China between Yinchuan and Xi'an. The line is the first railway to connect Qingyang to the Chinese railway network, and also the first railway to connect Ningxia and Yinchuan to the high-speed railway network.

Construction
Construction began in December 2015. The first full-length test run was carried out in October 2020. The line opened on 26 December 2020 as planned.

Route
The line has 20 stations in Ningxia, Gansu and Shaanxi.

Between Yinchuan and Wuzhong, the route is shared with the Yinchuan–Lanzhou high-speed railway. This section opened on December 19, 2019.

Stations

References

High-speed railway lines in China
Rail transport in Ningxia
Rail transport in Gansu
Railway lines opened in 2020